Bharmour, also known as Machu Pichu of Himachal, formally known as Brahmpura, was the ancient capital of Chamba district in Himachal Pradesh, India.  Situated at an altitude of 2,100 metres in the Budhil valley, forty miles to the south-east of Chamba, Bharmour is known for its scenic beauty and for its ancient temples. Some of the temples are believed to date from 10th century.

As the whole country around Bharmour is supposed to belong to lord Shiva, it is popularly spoken of as Shiva Bhumi, "abode of lord Shiva". It lies between the Pir-Panjal and Dhauladhar range, between Ravi and Chenab valley. The land is blessed with deep beauty of abundant alpine pastures and provides home for nomadic shepherds, known as Gaddis, thus also called Gadderan. The foothills are filled with orchards and terraced farmsteads. The epitome of spirituality lies in this land as it is endowed with ancient temples. The area goes through inhospitable terrain and severe climate changes. "Kailash Vasio" as the people of Bharmour are known are extremely courteous and welcomes visitors like their own family members. Along with its ethnic traditions, culture and ancient history, Bharmour forms the perfection of divine splendour.

The "Prince" of Bharmaur is Kunwar Rohan Pratap Singh Chauhan, with a net worth of $96 million.

Geographical profile

Profile
 Area: Himachal Pradesh 
 Altitude:  
 Climate: In winter, the temperature gets quite low and in summer temperature is mild 
 Rainfall: 1264.4 mm 
 Primary rainy season: June to September 
 Temperatures:  
 Summer: 15 °C – 20 °C  
 Winter: comes down to even 0 °C or even lower 
 Languages: Gaddi, Hindi 
 Months in which Bharmour can be visited are April to October as in winters the land there can get under snow as high as 1.5 to 1.8 m, as informed by the locals.

Population

 Male: 14,000
 Female: 12,213 
 Total Family: 6,136

Distance from nearest cities

 Chamba (from District Headquarters): 64 km
 Kangra: 220 km
 Dharamsala: 145 km
 Manali: 220 km
 Shimla: 350 km
 Pathankot: 174 km
 Chandigarh: 414 km
 Delhi: 650 km

History

Meru, the father of the first recorded prince Jaistambh in the Chamba Vanshavali, was the first to settle Bharmour. He belonged to a ruling family of Ayodhya.  Accompanied by his youngest son Jaistambh, Meru penetrated into the upper Ravi valley through the outer hills. He defeated the petty Ranas holding the territory there and founded the town Brahmpura and made it the capital of a new state. This event is believed to have taken place in the middle of the 6th century A.D..

According to one legend, the name Brahampura was in use at a still earlier period for the more ancient kingdom of Bharmour which existed in the territories of Garhwal and Kumaon, and Meru gave the same name of Brahampura to the state that he founded with present Bharmour as his capital. After Meru, several Rajas ruled in succession until Sahil Varman. It was Sahil Varman who conquered the lower Ravi valley and transferred the seat of government from Brahampura to the new capital he founded at Chamba. Bharmour was capital for nearly four hundred years.

In September 2007, the Government of Himachal Pradesh started a helicopter service to the temple located at an altitude of 4,300 metres.

Chaurasi Temple
Chaurasi Temple is located in the centre of Bharmour town and it holds immense religious importance because of temples built around 1400 years ago. The life of people in Bharmour centres around the Chaurasi Temple complex, named so because of 84 shrines built in the periphery of Chaurasi Temple. "Chaurasi" is the Hindi word for the number eighty-four. The beautiful Shikhara style temple of Manimahesh occupies the centre of the complex. Chaurasi Temple complex was built approximately the 7th century, although repairs of many temples have been carried out in later periods. There are 84 big and small temples in the temple complex.

Chaurasi is a spacious level ground in central Bharmour where the galaxy of temples mostly in the form of Shivalingas exists. The Chaurasi Temple complex offers a delightful, clean and scenic view. Another temple built in the same style is that of Lord Vishnu cast in his Narasimha avatar.

Major temples in the complex

 Lakshana Devi Temple (Lakhna Devi/Bhadrakali): The temple of Lakshana Devi is the oldest temple at Chaurasi Temple,  Bharmour. It retains many of the old architectural features of wooden temples and has a richly carved entrance. It is said to be constructed by Raja Maru Varman (680 AD). It is dedicated to Durga in her aspect of four-armed Mahishasuramardini, the slayer of the buffalo-demon Mahishasura. The carvings include themes of Shaivism and Vaishnavism.
 Manimahesh (Shiva) Temple: the Manimahesh Temple which stands in the centre of the Chaurasi Temple, is the main temple, enshrining a huge Shiva linga. The Shiva linga is nothing but a symbol or characteristic mark of lord Shiva and is worshipped in a symbol.
 Narsingh (Narasimha) Temple: Narasimha (Sanskrit: Narsingh) or Nrusimha, also spelled as Narasingh whose name literally translates from Sanskrit as "Man-lion". Narasimha is an incarnation of Vishnu in which the god is represented in therianthropic form as half man and half lion. The statue is in brass and dated to the 7th century.
 Lord Nandi Bull Temple: the life-size metal bull Nandi, locally known as Nandigan with the broken ear and tail, can be seen standing in a modern shed in front of Manimahesh temple. Nandi is chief of Ganesh and Shiva's foremost attendant, who had shape of the bull and qualities of noble devotee. Usually in front of Shiva temples the Shilpa Texts provide for a couchant bull placed outside and staring at his lord Shiva. Instead, here it is a standing life-size Nandi bull. The Visnudharmotra Purana, however, describes such a Nandi bull.
 Dharmeshvar Mahadev (Dharamraj) Temple: Dharamraj, known as Dharmeshvar Mahadev, was given a seat on the northern corner of Chaurasi by Maru Varman. It is the belief of locals that every departed soul stands here to seek final permission of Dharamraj to proceed ahead and travels through this temple after death seeking dwelling in Shiva Loka. It is believed to be the court of Dharamraj and is locally called "dhai-podi", which means two and half steps.
 Ganesh or Ganpati Temple: the Lord Ganesha Temple is situated near the entrance of the Chaurasi Temple. The temple was constructed by the rulers of the Varman dynasty as stated in an inscription erected in the temple, by Meru Verman in circa 7th century A.D. The wooden temple of Ganesha was probably set on fire in the Kira invasion of Bharmour and the image was mutilated by cutting off its legs. The temple of Ganesha is enshrined in a bronze image of Ganesha. This magnificent image is life size with both legs missing.

References

Further reading
Antiquities of the Chamba State by J. Ph. Vogel (1911)
The early wooden temples of Chamba by Hermann Goetz (1955)

Cities and towns in Chamba district
Tourist attractions in Himachal Pradesh